Grevillea manglesii is a species of flowering plant in the family Proteaceae and is endemic to an area around Perth in Western Australia. It is a spreading shrub with divided leaves, with triangular or linear lobes, and clusters of cream-coloured or white flowers.

Description

Taxonomy
Grevillea manglesii was first formally described in 1838 by Pierre Denis Pépin in the journal Annales de flore et de pomone :ou journal des jardins et des champs. The specific epithet (manglesii) honours James Mangles.

The species was later described by Robert Graham who gave it the name Anadenia manglesii in the Edinburgh New Philosophical Journal in 1839.

The names of three subspecies are accepted by the Australian Plant Census:
 Grevillea manglesii subsp. dissectifolia (McGill.)
 Grivillea manglesii subsp. ornithopoda (Meisn.)

Distribution and habitat
Grevillea manglesii grows on granite outcrops and on roadsides near Perth in the Avon Wheatbelt, Jarrah Forest, Swan Coastal Plain and Warren bioregions of south-western Western Australia.

Conservation status
This grevillea is listed as "not threatened" by the Government of Western Australia Department of Biodiversity, Conservation and Attractions.

Use in horticulture
This species is hardy in cultivation, including in humid areas and has proved useful as a screening shrub. It will grow in both full sun and part shade and prefers a well-drained situation.

References

manglesii
Eudicots of Western Australia
Proteales of Australia
Plants described in 1838